A district heating substation is a component in a district heating system that connects the main network to a building's own heating system.

The station normally has one or more of the following parts:

 Heat exchanger - to split primary and secondary side of the system
 Control valve - to regulate the flow through the heat exchanger
 Differential pressure controller - to balance the network and improve working conditions of control valve
 Strainer - to remove particles that could block heat exchanger or control valve
 Shut off valve - to stop the flow on primary side in case of service or emergency
 Heat meter - to measure energy consumption and allocate costs
 Temperature controller - to control temperature on secondary side by regulating the flow on primary side
 Temperature sensor - to sense flow and return temperatures required for temperature control 

In addition, a district heating substation may also include:

 Pump
 Safety valve
 Manometer
 Non-return valve

References

External links
Heating Technology

District heating